The 1964 Liège–Bastogne–Liège was the 50th edition of the Liège–Bastogne–Liège cycle race and was held on 3 May 1964. The race started and finished in Liège. The race was won by Willy Bocklant of the Flandria team.

General classification

References

1964
1964 in Belgian sport
1964 Super Prestige Pernod